Swan was an electoral district of the Legislative Assembly in the Australian state of Western Australia from 1890 to 1950 and again from 1962 to 1983.

The district was located in the Swan Valley, to the east of Perth. The district was one of the original 30 seats contested at the 1890 election. It was abolished ahead of the 1950 election, at which point incumbent member Gerald Wild of the Liberal Party became the member for the new seat of Dale. Revived for the 1962 election, it was won by John Brady of the Labor Party, hitherto the member for Guildford-Midland. Swan was again abolished at the 1983 election, whence incumbent member Gordon Hill of the Labor Party won the new seat of Helena.

Members

Election results 

Swan